Günther Märker (born c. 1942) is an Austrian male curler.

At the national level, he is a three-time Austrian men's champion curler.

At the time on the 1983 World Championship, he was employed as an insurance agent.

Teams

References

External links

Living people
Austrian male curlers
Austrian curling champions
1940s births
Place of birth missing (living people)